Avrasya University is the first private university in Trabzon, Turkey. Established in 2010, it is a young university in Turkey.

History

Avrasya University is established in 2010.

Avrasya university has 4 faculties, 4 Schools, 3 Institutes,  staff of high caliber and  students coming from various cities.

Campus

Pelitli campus 
Rectorate
Faculty of Economics and Administrative Sciences

Yalincak Campus 
Vocational School of Health Services

Yomra Campus 
Faculty of Engineering and Architecture
Faculty of Science and Literature

See also
List of forestry universities and colleges

References 

Trabzon
Universities and colleges in Turkey
Buildings and structures in Trabzon
2010 establishments in Turkey
Educational institutions established in 2010